The National Real Estate Development Council (NAREDCO) was established self-regulatory body in 1998 under the aegis of Housing And Urban Affairs Government of India.

References

External links
 NAREDCO homepage

Councils of India